Dryfoos is a surname. Notable people with the surname include:

 Joy G. Dryfoos (1925–2012), American sociologist 
 Orvil Dryfoos (1912–1963), American newspaper publisher

See also
 Dreyfus (surname)
 Dreifuss (surname)